Likiep Atoll (Marshallese:) is a coral atoll of 65 islands in the Pacific Ocean, and forms a legislative district of the Ratak Chain of the Marshall Islands. The population of Likiep Atoll was 401 in 2011.

History

The first recorded sighting by Europeans was by the Spanish expedition of Ruy López de Villalobos in January 1543. On 5 January 1565, its sighting was again recorded by the patache San Lucas, commanded by Alonso de Arellano, part of the Spanish expedition of Miguel López de Legazpi, which had by then separated from Legazpi's fleet. On 12 January 1565, it was Legazpi who arrived to Likiep Atoll and charted them as Los Corrales ("farmyards" in Spanish).

In 1877, Likiep Atoll was purchased by  Georg Eduard Adolph Capelle, a German trader, and partner with whaler Anton Debrum in the trading firm Capelle & Co, which traded extensively in copra and marine products throughout Micronesia. Likiep Atoll was claimed by the Empire of Germany along with the rest of the Marshall Islands in 1884, and the Germans established a trading outpost. After World War I, the island came under the South Seas Mandate of the Empire of Japan. The base became part of the vast US Naval Base Marshall Islands. Following the end of World War II, it came under the control of the United States, as part of the Trust Territory of the Pacific Islands, until the independence of the Marshall Islands in 1986.

Debrum House (1890), on Likiep Island, is listed on the U.S. National Register of Historic Places.

Key islands
Key islands making up Likiep Atoll include:

 Agony Island
 Anal Island
 Etoile Island
 Tokaen Island

Education
Marshall Islands Public School System operates public schools:
 Jebal Elementary School
 Likieb Elementary School
 Melang Elementary School

Northern Islands High School on Wotje serves the community.

References

External links
Marshall Islands site

Carmen C.H. Petrosian-Husa, The De Brum Photo Collection - Memento Mori, Alele Report 2005/1, Historic Preservation Office, Majuro, Marshall Islands.

 
Highest points of countries
Atolls of the Marshall Islands
Ratak Chain